is a character in Resident Evil (Biohazard in Japan), a survival horror video game series created by Japanese company Capcom. He debuted as one of the two player characters of the video game Resident Evil 2 (1998), alongside Claire Redfield. During the events of Resident Evil 2, Leon is a rookie police officer who arrives in the doomed Raccoon City late for his first day on the job, only to confront a zombie outbreak first-hand.

During the course of the game, he teams up with civilian survivor Claire Redfield, rescues the young Sherry Birkin, and is aided by the mysterious Ada Wong. Six years later, in Resident Evil 4 (2005), Leon returns as a Division of Security Operations (D.S.O) agent for the U.S. federal government, part of a special anti-Umbrella Corporation task force, assigned to rescue the president's daughter, Ashley Graham, from a sinister cult. In Resident Evil 6 (2012), he continues to work for the U.S. government and reunites with Ada and an adult Sherry.

Leon is the protagonist of several Resident Evil games and novelizations. Leon also appears in the CG animated films and in the animated miniseries Infinite Darkness (2021). In later games, such as the Resident Evil 2 remake (2019) and the Resident Evil 4 remake (2023), his features were based on Romanian model Eduard Badaluta. In the live-action films, Leon has been portrayed by actors Johann Urb and Avan Jogia. Video game publications list Leon among the most popular and iconic video game characters, and he ranks consistently as a fan favorite character of the franchise.

Concept and design
Leon was created by Hideki Kamiya as a contrast to Chris Redfield from the original Resident Evil, who he felt was the "blunt, tough-guy type". Though Kamiya admitted that while he was a fan of characters like Chris, as it had already been done, he opted to take Leon's development in a different direction. Leon was created for Resident Evil 2 as the staff wanted to use a character who had no experience with terrifying situations in contrast to using returning protagonists. While he was originally designed as a veteran police officer, he was changed to a rookie after the original version of Resident Evil 2 (popularly known as "Resident Evil 1.5") had been scrapped. Leon's design was inspired by Capcom artist Isao Ohishi. While Kamiya created Leon alongside Claire, he was aided by novelist Noboru Sugimura in order to make the writing more appealing. Sugimura often revised the Resident Evil 2 scenario such as the multiple interactions the two player characters have and what weapon should each acquire.

Elements from Leon's backstory from the Resident Evil 2 manual indicating having had a split with a woman were based on Kamiya's own life. Kamiya further commented that the relationship Leon has with Ada Wong is manipulative by the latter. Speaking about the relationship between Leon and Ada, Urb said: "It's kind of like Mulder and Scully and an X-Files type of deal, where you're waiting for it to happen, but it never does. Maybe in the next one, I'm hoping." Though director Makoto Kamiya initially wanted the film Resident Evil: Damnation to follow the dysfunctional romance between Leon and Ada, such idea was scrapped. Writer Shotaro Suga further elaborated on the romance was briefly explored in Resident Evil 4 and since both never met in Resident Evil 5, there might have been a time when the two met as suggested by an interaction in the film.

Kamiya was surprised at how popular Leon had become, praising his later evolution into a laid-back character for Resident Evil 4 and adding that he "fell in love all over again". Leon was announced as Resident Evil 4s protagonist in November 2002. As the game was developed, it was intended that Leon would be infected with the Progenitor virus. This concept was expanded upon in 2004, when Leon was meant to contract a bizarre disease in his fight against the game's enemies. In a documentary explaining the conception of the game's characters, it was stated that Leon was intended to "look tougher, but also cool". His face was modeled after the game's animation department director Christian Duerre. Masaki Yamanaka explains the change to Leon from Resident Evil 2 as being due to the experience he has gained since that game. He was buffed up accordingly, but Yamanaka did not want him "too buffed out".

During the development of Resident Evil: Degeneration, producer Hiroyuki Kobayashi stated that Leon and Claire returned as protagonists due to their relationship and role in Resident Evil 2 and the recent release of Resident Evil 4. Leon was also added too because of his experience, especially with how he works with the new character Angela. The producer said in 2009 would like to make another game starring Leon as the main character. Resident Evil 5s producer Jun Takeuchi said that the series' fans "would really love" a video game featuring both Leon and Chris as the protagonists due to their popularity, and at the same time, it would be "pretty dramatic" if the two characters never met before the series would end. Resident Evil 6s producer Kobayashi took a liking to Leon and decided to include him in the game since "he is central to the story". His eventual inclusion led to make his story be more horror-based than the rest of the cast and give a sense of incomplete as players would need to choose the other protagonists to understand it. His initial design is meant to be that of a civilian as well as giving the idea of being easy to fight. For his China design, the clothing is meant to give an air of stylishness that contrasts Chris' military equipment. His key color was blue. The initial jacket is also meant to fit a civilian look.

To meet modern expectations for the 2019 Resident Evil 2 remake, the team decided to alter some character designs to better match the more photorealistic setting; for example, Leon no longer wears large shoulder pads, which were added to distinguish his original, low-polygon model. The remake of Resident Evil 4 was worked with Leon having more abilities to overcome even the most difficult of situations, being envisioned as a more realistic person rather than as a superhero. His characterization was also affected to react more to the enemies to the point he would often insult them.

In the film Resident Evil: Vendetta, Kobayashi aimed for Leon to be properly portrayed as a main character though other staff members wanted Chris to be the lead. With Rebecca's addition, the team decided to use this addition in order to generate another contrast with Resident Evil 6. The chase scene between Leon and dogs were nearly removed from the movie. Although Vendetta takes place after Resident Evil 6, director Eiichirō Hasumi made the mini-series Resident Evil: Infinite Darkness to be set before the game events in order to have more freedom with the younger incarnations of Leon and Claire. as he noted they were too popular and thus they wanted to be careful wiith their characterizations. The new character named Jason is meant to mirror Leon's sense of justice because of their similar backgrounds and ideas about how to deal with partners. The director was warned to remember the mini-series "was animation" during the interactions between Leon and Jason as he had to maintain tension.

Portrayal

Leon is voiced by Paul Haddad in Resident Evil 2. Paul Mercier takes the role in Resident Evil 4, Resident Evil: Degeneration and Resident Evil: The Darkside Chronicles. Mercier remembers being happy with the localizer, Shinsaku Ohara, and the team in the making of the game ever since its early demo. Despite initial issues in the making of Resident Evil 4, Mercier was relieved of his work as Leon was not removed and also felt joy when having the opportunity to work with director Ginny Mcswain. Nevertheless, Capcom requested Mercier to rerecord some lines because they felt Leon sounded too old for his age. While Leon acts sarcastic in Resident Evil 4, he behaves colder in the first CGI film; Mercier believes Capcom wanted a different take on Leon when developing the film. Nevertheless, the actor expressed joy in making the film. For the prequel Darkside Chronicles, Mercier expressed difficulties in voicing the younger Leon while still understanding how different he was in this title due to the hardships he faces.

Mercier was replaced by Matthew Mercer in Resident Evil 6, Resident Evil: Damnation, Resident Evil: Revelations 2 and Resident Evil: Vendetta. Mercer described himself as a fan and friend of Mercier and said that he felt honored to take over as the voice of Leon In an interview, he also detailed his interpretation of Leon and talked about the changes being made to the character. Mercer elaborates the Leon from Damnation is far more "younger, cockier" character, and "actually follows his transition" in contrast to the "broken, downtrodden Leon that Resident Evil 6 begins with". Thanks to discussions with the director, Mercer was able to give his character more personality, linking him to the superhero Spider-Man who also has a tendency to perform oneliners. However, Mercer claims that since some of Leon's enemies are silent, there is a little area to perform more jokes. Due to the dark narrative of 6 and Damnation, Mercer believes that Leon in Vendetta is a more terrified character who no longer trusts in his own skills. In the Resident Evil 2 commercial directed by George A. Romero, Leon was portrayed by Brad Renfro.

About Johann Urb's casting in Resident Evil: Retribution, the film's producer and director Paul W. S. Anderson said, "You have no idea how difficult it is to find someone with Leon Kennedy's hair [who] has to be manly and has to have these long bangs," adding that "if you put photographs of them side-by-side, it's almost like he was manufactured by Capcom." Anderson said that the decision to include Leon and other game characters in the film was "fan-driven". Urb mentioned that he learned the video game Leon's mannerisms from watching clips posted on YouTube, commenting that "he doesn't have a high-pitched voice. I feel like he talks how I naturally talk, which is kind of slower."

In Resident Evil: Operation Raccoon City, Christian Lanz voiced Leon. Nick Apostolides is the voice and motion capture of Leon in the remake of Resident Evil 2 and Resident Evil 4, including in the film Resident Evil: Infinite Darkness. Apostolides stated that thanks to the Resident Evil 2 remake he was able to have more exposure in his career. The actor was shocked when he was cast for the role as he recalls being a fan of the franchise and noted that director needed a new voice for Leon due to the remake's younger persona. He also provided the motion capture for such work. He went on to describe the character as a good nature young adult who stumbles into one of the biggest mayhems ever as a result of the outbreak in Racoon City. He was also curious about the character's relationship with Ada Wong, believing the former had feelings for the latter but found this unhealthy due to how the franchise expands these two's connection. His facial features on the remake of Resident Evil 2 were based on model Eduard Badaluta.

Leon's Japanese actor Toshiyuki Morikawa said Leon has an unwavering sense of justice and the strength of his convictions, so he tries to make sure that everyone who enjoys the work can easily enter the world. He further said he enjoyed his character, while being a life-sized young man that people can find anywhere, he grows up by getting involved in big incidents and fully demonstrates his various skills, resulting in him growing confident and secure enough to be a hero. However, he had the hardest time in the Resident Evil 2 remake where he acted when he was younger. Morikawa was able to enter the world smoothly this time by playing the role of Leon, who has become more splendid after that.

Appearances

In Resident Evil series
Leon debuted in Resident Evil 2 (1998), as one of the game's two protagonists alongside Claire Redfield. In the story, he is a police officer on his first day who arrives in the Midwestern United States town of Raccoon City just after a viral outbreak begins. He meets Claire by chance as she is chased by zombies created by the T-virus. Together, they flee towards the Raccoon City Police Department building but soon get separated and go on their own ways. They eventually meet again at the Umbrella Corporation underground research complex responsible for the viral outbreak. Along the way, Leon teams-up with Ada, a mysterious and charming woman eventually revealed as a spy seeking a sample of the even more powerful G-virus. During the final confrontation against the seemingly unstoppable T-103 Tyrant that constantly pursues the characters, Ada tosses Leon (or Claire, depending on the scenario) a rocket launcher to destroy the creature. In the end, Leon faces and kills the grotesquely mutated Umbrella scientist William Birkin, and escapes from the self-destructing facility along with Claire and Birkin's young daughter Sherry.

An epilogue obtained after completing Resident Evil 3: Nemesis (1999) reveals that Leon later joined the U.S. federal government. In Resident Evil – Code: Veronica (2000), Claire contacts Leon to relay information to her brother Chris while stuck on Rockfort Island. Resident Evil: The Darkside Chronicles (2009) features re-imaginings of Resident Evil 2 and Resident Evil - Code Veronica; it also contains a new scenario set in 2002 that involves Leon and the soldier Jack Krauser on a mission to search for Javier Hidalgo, an ex-drug lord who had been reported to do business with Umbrella.

Leon is the protagonist of Resident Evil 4 (2005). In 2004, he is a special agent assigned to rescue the U.S. president's daughter Ashley Graham who is being held somewhere in Europe. Her kidnappers turn out to be part of an evil cult known as Los Illuminados, which has taken control of local villagers using parasites known as Las Plagas. As Leon searches for Ashley, he is captured and injected with the parasite. With help from Ada Wong and the Illuminados researcher Luis Sera, Leon is able to remove Las Plagas from his body and to rescue Ashley while confronting the cult. At the climax of the game, Leon kills the cult leader Osmund Saddler, but is forced to give a Plagas sample to Ada, who escapes in a helicopter, leaving Leon and Ashley to escape on a watercraft. Leon is also one of the protagonists in Resident Evil 6 (2012), alongside Chris Redfield, Jake Muller and Ada Wong.

Capcom announced a reimagining of Resident Evil 2 at E3 2018 in June, and Leon was shown shooting a zombie and returning in Resident Evil 2 (2019). In June 2022, Leon is also set to appear in the remake of Resident Evil 4 (2023).

Leon also appears in several non-canonical games in the series. He stars alongside Barry Burton in the Game Boy Color-only Resident Evil Gaiden (2001). Along with Claire, Leon is one of two playable characters in the browser and mobile game Resident Evil: Zombie Busters. In the third-person shooter Resident Evil: Operation Raccoon City (2012) revisiting the Raccoon City incident, the players control Umbrella operatives sent to kill any survivors, and certain actions can lead to Leon's death. He is also a player character in the "Heroes" mode of this game and is portrayed by the computer-animated film Leon face model, Jamisin Matthews. Leon, along with Claire's costume, appears in Resident Evil: Resistance (2020).

In films

Leon teams up with Claire Redfield in the 2008 computer-animated film Resident Evil: Degeneration in order to stop another outbreak of the T-virus on American soil. He returns in the sequel Resident Evil: Damnation, where he is sent to investigate the use of the Las Plagas during a civil war in Eastern Europe. Starting with Resident Evil: Degeneration, Capcom modeled the computer-animated Leon Kennedy after Jamisin Matthews. Unlike the live-action film series, the animated films are canonically set in the same universe as the game series, serving as the prequels to Resident Evil 5 and Resident Evil 6, respectively. A third computer-animated film Resident Evil: Vendetta (2017) starring Chris Redfield, Leon Kennedy and Rebecca Chambers. A guilty-ridden Leon joins Chris on rescue operation and decrypt Glenn Arias's plan of a large-scale attack on New York City. Leon also appears in the Netflix series Resident Evil: Infinite Darkness (2021). He encounters zombies when the White House is targeted in a mysterious attack. He later meets Claire Redfield, who has been investigating a strange drawing made by a child refugee while working on a TerraSave-led mission to oversee construction of a welfare facility. He returned in the sequel to the animated film, Resident Evil: Death Island.

In an interview, director Paul W. S. Anderson said that, if Resident Evil: Afterlife succeeds, he would do a fifth film and would like Leon to make an appearance in it. Leon also appeared as a major character in Resident Evil: Retribution (2012), "poised to rumble with Bad Rain and the defected Jill Valentine". The live-action version of Leon is leader of a mercenary group working for Albert Wesker who teams up with the film's version of Ada to fight Umbrella, save Alice and rescue Jill. At the end of the film, he is one of the characters to survive. In the reboot film Resident Evil: Welcome to Raccoon City (2021), Leon was played by Avan Jogia and teams up with Claire and Brian Irons to escape the city

Other appearances
Leon is featured in the 1998-1999 manhua Shēnghuà Wēijī 2 ("Biological Crisis 2"). A romantic comedy retelling of the story of Resident Evil 2, centered on Leon, Claire and Ada, was released in the Taiwanese two-issue comic Èlíng Gǔbǎo II in 1999. Leon also appeared as a character in the Image Comics comic book Resident Evil, including the novels Resident Evil: City of the Dead and Resident Evil: Underworld by S. D. Perry. On Halloween Horror Nights 2013 held at Universal Orlando, Leon was featured as one of two main characters in a haunted house called "Resident Evil: Escape from Raccoon City", based on Resident Evil 2 and Resident Evil 3: Nemesis.

Outside the Resident Evil franchise, Leon appears as a costume for the character Chris Redfield in the fighting game Ultimate Marvel vs. Capcom 3. He appears as a solo unit playable character in Project X Zone 2. He makes a special guest appearance as a spirit in the Nintendo's crossover video game Super Smash Bros. Ultimate. Leon and multiple other Resident Evil characters appear as playable characters in Dead by Daylight. His Persistent Investigator and Impervious Agent skins were also included. Leon has also appeared in an online multiplayer battle royale game Knives Out at July 29 to August 12, 2021. In August 2021, the character Lion from Rainbow Six Siege received Leon Kennedy's skin. In February 2022, both Leon and Chris appeared as an easter egg in Dying Light 2. In March 2023, Leon and Claire appeared in Fortnite Battle Royale.

Reception

Popularity
Since his appearance in Resident Evil 2, Leon has had a positive reception. In 2010, Nintendo Power listed him as their 14th favorite Nintendo gaming hero, stating that he went from a "glorified meter maid with a bad haircut" to a tough guy. In 2009, GameSpot chose him as one of the 64 characters to compete in their poll for the title "All Time Greatest Game Hero". In a 2010 Famitsu poll, Leon was voted by readers as the 31st most popular video game character in Japan. In the Guinness World Records Gamer's Edition from 2011, he was voted as the 36th best video game character. In 2012, GamesRadar ranked him as the 11th most "influential and badass" hero in video games. Empire also included Leon on their list of the 50 greatest video game characters, ranking him 44th. IGN ranked Leon as the best playable Resident Evil character, writing Leon "quickly became one of the most capable characters in the series, matching Chris in hand-to-hand combat and being referred to as a genius by Ada." In 2015, Logo TV ranked Leon as the eighth on their list of the sexiest male video game characters. Tristan Jurkovich of TheGamer has claimed that Leon Kennedy was second of the best Resident Evil character of all time, and stated that "Leon is a part of the two best regarded games in the franchise by fans. For the more classic style game, Resident Evil 2 is where it's at." In 2021, Rachel Weber of GamesRadar ranked Leon as 24th of their "50 iconic video game characters."

IGN also repeatedly named him a character they wished to see in the crossover fighting series Super Smash Bros., describing him an "intimidating hero", a "unique breed of ass kicker" and one of the best things to happen to the Resident Evil series, along with GamingBolt and Screen Rant. In 2010, Game Informer chose Leon as one of the 20 Capcom characters they would like to see in a rumored crossover fighting game titled Namco Vs Capcom, his Namco equivalent being Nightmare from the Soul series: "The only man with enough experience and courage to take out this mutated menace is none other than Leon S. Kennedy. We bet this fight ends with a rocket launcher." In 2011, Ryan Woo of Complex ranked Leon among the fourth most stylish video game character, opining he is the best dressed person in the Resident Evil series, and "Jill just looks goofy in comparison."

According to PlayStation Universe'''s Mike Harradence, "we've seen Kennedy transition from a likeable, wet-behind-the-ears, love-sick puppy to a wise-cracking, super smooth government agent." The character was one of the childhood crushes of Kendra Beltran from MTV, who in 2013 wrote: "I still can't forget the rate my heart raced when my eyes set on Leon. I'm sure you felt and continue to feel the same." In 2014, La Nueva España included the "intelligent, quick-drawing and strong" Leon among the top ten sexiest video game characters of both genders, describing him as a "reinforced concrete wall with a porcelain face." In 2017, Rexly Peñaflorida of Tom's Hardware included Leon among the best protagonist characters in video games.

Critical response
Leon and Claire were praised for their debut in Resident Evil 2 as well as their different scenarios and how the remake was faithful to them. In the book Immersion, Narrative, and Gender Crisis in Survival Horror Video Games, Andrei Nae described Leon's Resident Evil 4 persona as a hypermasculine persona similar to Ethan Tomas from Condemned: Criminal Origins due to how skilled they are showned. GamesRadar described Leon's Resident Evil 4 design as "David Bowie piloting the Memphis Belle", stating that, while it was appealing, the hairstyle required modifications for encounters in the games. However, Complex said "his sarcastic and moody attitude in RE4", adding that, while Leon "stepped it up in the series by maturing and becoming a true hero", they "enjoyed the game more when Leon didn't speak." Leon's continuous journey to save Ashley in Resident Evil 4 have often been the subject of criticism due frustation given to the players.

Together with Ada Wong, Leon often seen as one of the most popular couples in gaming even if their relationship is dysfunctional. Before the release of Resident Evil 6, Aylon Herbet of Gameplanet wrote that if both Leon and Chris would share starring roles in a Resident Evil game it would be "awesome". while IGN has featured Leon on the list of things they would like to see in Resident Evil 6, calling him one of the two main characters of the series along with Chris Redfield. Cass Marshall of Polygon described Leon as a "sexy side of its star" in the remake of Resident Evil 2, while Ravi Sinha of GamingBolt considered the character's design among the worst in video games, noting that the developers should have kept his original design.

There was also commentary on Leon's film persona. Blu-ray.com found Leon's Damnation to be faithful video game adaptations especially thanks to the characters' dynamics. Other other critics enjoyed the dynamics between Leon and Ada for being faithful to their original video game personas. Leon's action sequences from Vendetta were also the subject of positive response even if they were ridiculous upon first seen. In his analysis of Resident Evil: Infinite Darkness, Daniel Quesada of HobbyConsolas has praised Leon's design, particularly his hair, and said it was "perfect, as we like it." Both IGN and NerdReactor felt that the narrative focused more one Leon's mind to the point that Claire felt like a minor character, while Paste Magazine had mixed opinions about his characterization and arc. In retrospective, Escapist Magazine said that Leon's best film was Damnation as both Degeneration and Vendetta made him driven by angst.IGN lamented the lack of screentime Leon has in the live-action film, while CalebMasters and GHBL panned his portrayal. Reviewing the film reboot, CNET found the new Leon to be secondary to the Redfields siblings who are more prominent in the narrative. Among voice actors, Paul Mercier's performance in Resident Evil 4 was praised for making him well produced, giving him the film Degeneration the nostalgia factor for reprising his work. Mercer's portrayal of the character was noted to be popular within fans as sites noted fans were disappointed once the actor claimed he would no reprise his role for the remakes.

Merchandise
Various types of merchandising have been released based on Leon. In 2004, Capcom announced a series of outfits based on Leon's clothing, called "Leon's Collection". In 2020, a statue and figurine of Leon was also made, alongside Claire. Capcom has released the 10 ml styled perfume of Leon in Japan, which are now on sale for ¥6380. In 2021, Capcom and Kadoya collaborated to produce an official reproduction of Leon's jacket from Resident Evil: Infinite Darkness. Capcom has also collaborated with Darkside Collectibles to develop a quarter-size Leon figurine based on his appearance in Resident Evil 4. In 2022, a $1500 Leon's jacket from the remake of Resident Evil 4 has been released. NAUTS and DAMTOYS have also released a 1/6 figurine of Leon from the remake of Resident Evil 2. In 2023, Kotobukiya opened up pre-orders for ARTFX figures of Leon from Resident Evil: Vendetta''.

See also

List of Resident Evil characters

References

Capcom protagonists
Characters in American novels of the 20th century
Male horror film characters
Fictional American people in video games
Fictional American police officers
Fictional gunfighters in video games
Fictional knife-fighters
Fictional Krav Maga practitioners
Fictional Systema practitioners
Fictional Secret Service personnel
Fictional zombie hunters
Fictional characters with post-traumatic stress disorder
Fictional martial artists in video games
Fictional police officers in video games
Fictional secret agents and spies in video games
Male characters in video games
Resident Evil characters
Science fiction film characters
Video game characters introduced in 1998